Chaplains Branch could mean:

Royal Canadian Chaplain Service
Royal Air Force Chaplains Branch
Royal Canadian Army Chaplain Corps
Chaplain Corps (United States Army)
Royal Army Chaplains' Department